The Under Dog is a 1932 short animated film produced by Walter Lantz Productions, and distributed by Universal Pictures. It is the fourth film featuring Pooch the Pup.

Plot
Pooch (now wearing shoes and a hat) is a penniless vagabond wandering the countryside, and carrying a bindle. On his way, he comes across his sweetheart the girl coonhound (now having lighter fur) who is milking a cow. After they greet each other, Pooch sings the song A Great Big Bunch of You. Moments later, an old dog, who is the girl coonhound's employer, shows up and isn't happy to see him. The old dog hurls Pooch past the fences bordering the farmlands where he lands next to a sign saying "No tramps allowed."

Still wanting to fit in, Pooch reenters the farmlands and comes to an outdoor dining table where a pack of farmers are eating. Pooch asks for some food but the farmers refuse to offer a piece. One of those who are dining is the old dog who shoos him away.

While standing around back outside the fences, Pooch spots an anthropomorphic tornado coming. Pooch returns to the farmlands to warn everybody about the approaching storm. The farmers flee in various directions. Pooch, the girl coonhound, and the old dog take shelter in a shed which is a storage for explosives. The tornado knows about this before picking up and setting the shed ablaze. Pooch helps the girl coonhound and the old dog leave the small house first. As Pooch stays in the shed for a few more moments, he picks up a windmill's turbine which he uses as a propeller to redirect the shed to the tornado. He then notices the farmers showing up to rescue him as they hold a life net. With this, Pooch finally jumps to his safety. The tornado tries to avoid the shed but to no avail. And when the shed, at last, detonates, the tornado is completely neutralized.

Back on the ground, the old dog is impressed with the heroic act of Pooch whom he now welcomes to the society. Pooch then continues to spend time with the girl coonhound. Pooch and the girl coonhound get themselves a house, a picket fence, and a stroller full of puppies looking identical to the boy beagle from the Oswald cartoons.

Song
Featured in the film is the song A Great Big Bunch of You which is composed by Harry Warren and Mort Dixon. The song was popularized by artists such as Al Bowlly, Eddie Lane, Cliff Edwards, Syd Lipton, Joe Moss, Harriot Lee, Jack Hylton, Carrol Gibbons, and the String of Pearls. It is also featured in a Merrie Melodies short which shares the song's title.

References

External links
The Under Dog at the Big Cartoon Database

1932 animated films
1932 comedy films
1932 films
American black-and-white films
Films directed by Walter Lantz
Universal Pictures short films
Walter Lantz Productions shorts
1930s American animated films
American comedy short films
Animated films about dogs
Universal Pictures animated short films
1930s English-language films